Li Jie, more commonly known by her pen name Anni Baobei or Annie Baby, is a Chinese novelist, born 11 July 1974 in Ningbo, Zhejiang.  Her first work in print was the 2000 novella Goodbye Vivian.

She is nicknamed "Flower in the Dark" by her readers due to her novels' themes of loneliness and isolation. Her work appears in Chinese magazines Harvest, Writers and Elle. She lives in Beijing.

Works
 Goodbye Vivian
 The Flower across the Bank
 Two and Three Matters
 Lotus
 Padma

Media adaptations
Soulmate (2016 film)  starring Sandra Ma and Zhou Dongyu based on Qiyue and Ansheng (七月与安生)
Another Me (2019 television series) starring Shen Yue, Chen Duling, and Xiong Ziqi based on Qiyue and Ansheng (七月与安生)
Beautiful Reborn Flower (2019 television series) starring Song Weilong, Lin Yun, Peter Ho, and Li Xin'ai based on The Flower across the Bank (彼岸花)
Endless Summer (an upcoming film) starring Luo Jin, Zhong Chuxi, and Tan Songyun based on August Never Ends (八月未央)

References

External links
 Profile from www.chinese-shortstories.com 
 Peony Literary Agency profile
 Fiction by Li Jie at WorldCat

Living people
1974 births
Pseudonymous women writers
Chinese women short story writers
Chinese romantic fiction writers
Writers from Ningbo
Women romantic fiction writers
20th-century Chinese women writers
21st-century Chinese women writers
Chinese women novelists
People's Republic of China novelists
20th-century Chinese short story writers
21st-century Chinese short story writers
People's Republic of China short story writers
Short story writers from Zhejiang
20th-century pseudonymous writers
21st-century pseudonymous writers